State Route 109 (SR 109) is a short, unsigned state highway in the U.S. state of California. It forms part of University Avenue in San Mateo County between U.S. Route 101 in East Palo Alto and State Route 84 in Menlo Park just west of the Dumbarton Bridge. Although the route is unsigned, it may be noted on some online maps.

Route description
SR 109 begins at U.S. Route 101 in East Palo Alto. It continues north, paralleling the city border with Menlo Park before entering Menlo Park and crossing a railroad. SR 109 passes by salt evaporators before terminating at SR 84 just west of the Dumbarton Bridge.

History
In April 1958, I-109 was proposed as a name for the route that is now Interstate 280. This proposal was rejected by AASHTO.
The California State Route 109 designation was first defined in 1963, running from Sunset Cliffs Boulevard to Interstate 5 in San Diego. In 1972, that route was deleted and was renumbered as a western extension of Interstate 8.  Later in 1984, SR 109 was defined as a route in Palo Alto.

The segment in East Palo Alto between US 101 and Notre Dame Avenue remains in local control. Under Cal S&HC § 409 (b), the state will not take control over this section until Caltrans and the city determine that it is in an "acceptable state of repair".

Major intersections

See also

References

External links

California Highways: SR 109
Caltrans: Route 109 highway conditions
California @ AARoads.com - State Route 109

109
State Route 109
Menlo Park, California